Castel d'Azzano is a comune (municipality) in the Province of Verona in the Italian region Veneto, located about  west of Venice and about  southwest of Verona.

The municipality of Castel d'Azzano contains the frazioni (subdivisions, mainly villages and hamlets) La Rizza, San Martino, and Forette.

Castel d'Azzano borders the following municipalities: Buttapietra, Verona, Vigasio, and Villafranca di Verona.

Demographic evolution

References

External links
 www.comune.castel-d-azzano.vr.it/

Cities and towns in Veneto